Memorial Park may refer to either a public park dedicated in memorial to an event, or a cemetery (modern term for such):

Parks
 Australia
 Bulimba Memorial Park, Bulimba, Brisbane, Queensland
 Toowong Memorial Park, Toowoong, Brisbane, Queensland
 Yeronga Memorial Park, Yeronga, Brisbane, Queensland
 Kangaroo Ground War Memorial Park, Melbourne, Victoria
 Bosnia and Herzegovina
 Vraca Memorial Park, Sarajevo
 Canada
 Memorial Provincial Park, Winnipeg, Manitoba
 Philippines
 Forest Lake Memorial Park
 China
 King George V Memorial Park, Kowloon
 Denmark
 Jutland Memorial Park, see Sea War Museum Jutland#War memorial
 France
 Australian Memorial Park, near Fromelles
 Hungary
 Memorial Park, Budapest also called Memento Park
 India
 Ambedkar Memorial Park
 Saraighat War Memorial Park
 Smritivan Earthquake Memorial and Museum
 Japan
 Asahiyama Memorial Park, Chūō-ku, Sapporo, Hokkaidō, Japan
 Hiroshima Peace Memorial Park
 Malaysia
 Sandakan Memorial Park, Malaysian state of Sabah

Poland

 The Great Synagogue Memorial Park in Oświęcim

 New Zealand
 Memorial Park, Hamilton, New Zealand
 Memorial Park, Manurewa, a stadium in New Zealand
 Memorial Park, Masterton, a stadium in New Zealand
 Memorial Park, Motueka, a stadium in Motueka, Tasman
 Memorial Park, Palmerston North, a stadium in New Zealand
 Memorial Park, Lower Hutt, a stadium in New Zealand
Serbia
 Memorial Park Jajinci
 Šumarice Memorial Park
 Taiwan
 Barclay Memorial Park, Tainan
 Chiang Wei-shui Memorial Park, Taipei
 Green Island White Terror Memorial Park, Taitung
 Kinmen Peace Memorial Park, Kinmen
 Military Memorial Park, Taichung
 Tang Te-chang Memorial Park, Tainan
 War and Peace Memorial Park and Theme Hall, Kaohsiung
 War and Peace Memorial Park Exhibition Center, Lienchiang
 Wushe Incident Memorial Park, Nantou
 Xiaolin Village Memorial Park, Kaohsiung
 Zhenge Daidan Memorial Park, Lienchiang
 Trinidad and Tobago
 Memorial Park, Port of Spain
 United Kingdom
 Forster Memorial Park, Lewisham, London
 War Memorial Park, Coventry
 United States of America
 Alaska
 Growden Memorial Park,  Fairbanks, Alaska
 Adair-Kennedy Memorial Park, Juneau, Alaska
 Arizona
 Wesley Bolin Memorial Plaza, Phoenix, Arizona
 California
 Memorial Park (San Mateo County, California)
 Memorial Park (Los Angeles Metro station), on the Metro Gold Line of Los Angeles County Metro Rail
 Memorial Park (Hayward, California)
 Sierra Madre Memorial Park in Sierra Madre, California
 Will Rogers Memorial Park,  Beverly Hills, California
 Hart Memorial Park,  Bakersfield, California
 Donner Memorial State Park California
 Leo J. Ryan Memorial Park, Foster City, California
 Memorial Park (Hayward, California)
 Colorado
 Memorial Park, Colorado Springs, Colorado
 Connecticut
 Harkness Memorial State Park,  Waterford, Connecticut
 Florida
 Memorial Park (Jacksonville), Florida
 Ronnie Van Zant Memorial Park, Lake Asbury, Clay County
 Georgia
 Memorial Park (Athens, Georgia)
 Iowa
 Veterans Memorial Park (Davenport, Iowa)
 Massachusetts
 Seekonk Veterans Memorial Park, Seekonk, Massachusetts
 War Memorial Park (West Bridgewater, Massachusetts)
 Missouri
 Memorial Park (Raymore)
 Nebraska
 Memorial Park (Omaha), Nebraska
 New York
 Theodore Roosevelt Memorial Park Oyster Bay, New York
 North Carolina
 Julian Price Memorial Park  North Carolina
 Oklahoma
 Washington Irving Memorial Park and Arboretum,  Bixby, Oklahoma
 Oregon
 Klamath Falls Veterans Memorial Park, Oregon
 Pennsylvania
 Memorial Park Site  Pennsylvania
 Rhode Island
 Miantonomi Memorial Park, Newport, Rhode Island
 Tennessee
 Memorial Park Cemetery (Memphis, Tennessee)
 Texas
 Memorial Park, Houston, Texas
 West Virginia
 Memorial Park, Huntington, West Virginia
 Wyoming
 George Washington Memorial Park (Jackson, Wyoming)
 American Memorial Park,  island of Saipan, Northern Mariana Islands

Cemeteries
 Australia
 Eastern Suburbs Memorial Park, Sydney, New South Wales
 Fawkner Crematorium and Memorial Park, Melbourne, Victoria
 Memorial Park Cemetery (Albany, Western Australia)
 Denmark
 Ryvangen Memorial Park, Copenhagen, Denmark
 New Zealand
 Bolton Street Memorial Park, Wellington
 Taiwan
 Xiaolin Village Memorial Park, Kaohsiung
 United Kingdom
 War Memorial Park, Coventry, England
 United States of America
 Alaska
 Anchorage Memorial Park
 Alberta
 Central Memorial Park, Calgary, Alberta
 Arizona
 Pioneer and Military Memorial Park,  Phoenix, Arizona
 California
 Forest Lawn Memorial Park (Glendale), California
 Forest Lawn Memorial-Parks & Mortuaries (list)
 Grand View Memorial Park Cemetery, Glendale, California
 Hillside Memorial Park Cemetery, Culver City, California,
 Mount Sinai Memorial Park Cemetery, Los Angeles, California
 Westwood Village Memorial Park Cemetery,  Los Angeles, California
 Valhalla Memorial Park Cemetery, North Hollywood
 Desert Memorial Park, Cathedral City, California
 Memorial Park (San Mateo County, California)
 Eden Memorial Park Cemetery, San Fernando Valley of Los Angeles
 El Camino Memorial Park,  San Diego, California
 Alta Mesa Memorial Park  Palo Alto, California
 Oakwood Memorial Park Cemetery, Chatsworth, California
 Oakwood Memorial Park (Santa Cruz, California)
 Cypress Lawn Memorial Park Colma, California
 Greenwood Memorial Park (San Diego),  San Diego, California
 Oak Hill Memorial Park,  San Jose, Santa Clara County, California
 Skylawn Memorial Park (San Mateo, California)
 Woodlawn Memorial Park Cemetery (Colma, California)
 Hills of Eternity Memorial Park, Colma
 Hawaii
 Valley of the Temples Memorial Park,  Hawaiian island of Oʻahu
 Michigan
 Glen Eden Lutheran Memorial Park,  Livonia, Michigan
 New Jersey
 George Washington Memorial Park (Paramus, New Jersey)
 Ohio
 Memorial Park (Columbus)
 Tennessee
 Woodlawn Memorial Park Cemetery,  Nashville, Tennessee
 Texas
  Conroe Memorial Park, Conroe, Texas
 Greenwood Memorial Park (Fort Worth, Texas) TX
 Washington
 Evergreen Washelli Memorial Park, Seattle, Washington
 Greenwood Memorial Park (Renton, Washington)

Other
 Memorial Park (Los Angeles Metro station)

See also
 Memorial Field (disambiguation)